Vista Hermosa means "beautiful view" in Spanish and may refer to:

Vista Hermosa, Meta, a town and municipality in Colombia.
C.D. Vista Hermosa, a football (soccer) club.
Vista Hermosa, Michoacán, a municipality in Mexico with its seat at Vista Hermosa de Negrete.
Vista Hermosa (Mexico City Metrobús), a BRT station in Mexico City.